Monte Alegre de Sergipe is a municipality located in the Brazilian state of Sergipe. Its population was 15,175 (2020).

References

Municipalities in Sergipe